Nicole Pinto, (born 1995, Panama City, Panama) is a Panamanian model and beauty pageant contestant who is the 1st runner up at Miss Panama World 2014. she represented Panama at Miss World 2014.

Miss Panamá World 2014 
She is the 1st runner up at the Miss Panamá 2014.

Miss Latin America 2014
Nicole Pinto participated in the 28th edition of the Miss Latin America that took place on September 6, 2014 at the Barceló Bávaro Beach Resort in Punta Cana, Dominican Republic, where it competed with 23 candidates from different countries and where was crowned by Julia Guerra de Brasil as Miss Latin America 2014.

However, on November 14, 2014 became public the decision of Nicole Pinto, to cede the title of Miss America Latina 2014, to be the representative of Panama in Miss World 2014 after the dismissal of Raiza Erlenbaugh, being that Nicole was the finalist of the Miss Panama World 2014.

Miss World 2014
She represented Panama in the 64th edition of the Miss World pageant held on December 14 at ExCeL London in London.

See also
 Miss Panamá 2014
 Miss World 2014

References

External links
Panamá 2014 official website
Miss Panamá

 

1995 births
Living people
Miss World 2014 delegates
Panamanian beauty pageant winners
People from Panama City